The 1839 Rhode Island gubernatorial election was held on April 17, 1839.

Incumbent Whig Governor William Sprague ran for re-election for a second term against Democratic nominee Nathaniel Bullock and Liberal nominee Tristram Burges.

Since no candidate received a majority in the popular vote, the senior Senator, Samuel Ward King, acted as Governor for the term.

General election

Candidates
Nathaniel Bullock, Democratic, former U.S. Collector of Customs
Tristram Burges, Liberal Prox (abolitionist), Whig nominee for Governor in 1836
William Sprague, Whig, incumbent Governor

Results

Notes

References

1839
Rhode Island
Gubernatorial